The Stratford Adventure is a 1954 National Film Board of Canada documentary film about the founding of the Stratford Shakespeare Festival, directed by Morten Parker. It tells the story of what was to become North America's premiere Shakespearean festival, on the banks of the Avon River in the small Ontario town of Stratford. It was named Film of the Year at the Canadian Film Awards and nominated for an Academy Award for Best Documentary Feature at the 27th Academy Awards.

Cast
 Michael Bates as himself
 Timothy Findley as himself
 Alec Guinness as himself
 Tyrone Guthrie as himself
 Irene Worth as herself

See also
 William Shakespeare

References

External links

Watch The Stratford Adventure at NFB.ca

1954 films
1950s English-language films
1954 documentary films
1954 short films
Canadian short documentary films
National Film Board of Canada short films
Documentary films about theatre
Films produced by Guy Glover
Films shot in Ontario
Films scored by Louis Applebaum
National Film Board of Canada documentaries
Best Picture Genie and Canadian Screen Award winners
1950s Canadian films